Abbaretz is a commune in the Loire-Atlantique department in the Pays de la Loire region of western France.

The inhabitants of the commune are known as Abbarois or Abbaroises.

Geography
Abbaretz is located 20 km south-west of Châteaubriant and 20 km north-east of Blain. Access to the commune is by the D2 road from Nozay in the west passing through the village and continuing east to La Meilleraye-de-Bretagne. The D1 road comes from Treffieux in the north passing through the village and continuing south. The D35 road comes from Issé in the north-east passing through the village and continuing south-west to Puceul. The D24 road branches from the D1 just south of the village and goes south-east to Joué-sur-Erdre. The D69 road from Issé to Nort-sur-Erdre passes through the east of the commune. Apart from the village there are also the hamlets of:

Les Breils-Clement
La Chauvelaie
La Chauvelais
Le Chene Trouy
Coulouine
La Gleminiere
La Godardais
La Hazardiere
Le Houx
Le Maffay
La Placiere
La Rainais
La Riviere
Rozay
Villeneuve

Neighbouring communes

Etymology
Abbaretz has been previously known by the following names:
Abbaretiacum (1123)
Abbaret (1230)
Abbarez (1270 and 1278)
Abbarrez (1341)
Abbaretz (1456)
Abbaret (1489)
La Baretz (1539)
Abbareium (1650)
Abbaretz (today).

The name Abbaretz originates from the Gallo language which is the language of Upper Brittany: Abarèt in Gallo (as per ELG)

History
Until the 8th century the parish of Abbaretiacum had its own Lord Bishop under the Bishops of Nantes. Following the invasion of Normandy and civil wars in Brittany in the 11th and 12th centuries Abbaretz ceased to be a feudal state. During the 10th century the lords of Chateaubriand took effective possession of the territory of Abbaretz: to enter Abbaretz was a privilege they gave to one of their younger sons, known by the name of Le Boeuf who was First Lord of Nozay and Issé. In 1123, however, the Duke Conan confirmed the church of Nantes as the owner of the church at Abbaretz.

In June 1230 Brient Le Boeuf, called "The Old Man", Lord of Issé, donated to the Cistercian Abbey of Notre Dame de Melleray, for the salvation of his soul, some land he owned at Abbaretz. The monks of this monastery built a barn and a chapel dedicated to St. Margaret. At the same time, Geoffroy de Trent abandoned his portion of Melleray Abbey and two-thirds of all the tithes of the land of the Abbaretz forest ("decimas terre sue de foresta de Abbaret").

In 1242, Guégon Le Gruc and his wife Agathe of Trent (daughter of Olivier and niece of Geoffroy of Trent) confirmed this pious donation. The parishioners of Abbaretz tried to oppose the increase in their tithes by the monks at Melleray. From the documents in the process, it can be seen that the area called the Forest of Abbaretz was inhabited in 1235 by Daniel and Bernard de Rozé, Guy Lague, Robin Daniel, Guillaume Robin, Riwallon Le Duc, Guillaume Robert, Pierre Constanz, Geffroy Grimaut, Guillaume Raffrey, and Judicaël Troynel who were all vassals of Geoffroy Trent.

When the diocese of Nantes was divided into archdeaconries and deaneries, the parish of Abbaretz was included in the deanery of Chateaubriand, a member of the archdeaconry of Mee.

The fiefs component of the Lordship of Abbaretz was composed of several parts:
the income from Nozay
the income from Issé
the income from Vioreau
the barony of Derval,
The Melleray Abbey

The headquarters of the most important Lordship was located at the Chateau de La Riviere which originally belongs to the Briant (or Brient) family and then passed into the hands of the lords of Chateaubriant, then the House of Montmorency, and then the Prince of Condé.

Heraldry

Administration

List of Successive Mayors of Abbaretz

Population

Age distribution
Percentage Distribution of Age Groups in Abbaretz and Loire-Atlantique Department

Languages
French and the local language of Gallo are spoken in the area. The Gallo language is in danger of extinction according to a study by Serge Jouin in his thesis: "The Gallo speech of Abbaretz and elsewhere ...", published in two volumes in 1982 and 1984. Abbaretz is also a point of survey for the linguistic atlas (ALBRAM) by Messrs. Guillaume and Chauveau.

Sights

Site of the tin mine. The area was known for its tin production into the 1960s but it has now been converted to recreational purposes.
The lake that was produced from tin extraction has an area of 15 hectares and is used for water skiing.
The slag heap is 121 metres high (which is 5 metres higher than the highest hill in the department - Breteche hill) provides a scenic view with hiking and para-sailing opportunities.
Chestnut tree of the Nonneries: this is a classified tree 800 years old.
Old Forges of the Jahotière which has now been converted into a hotel and function centre.
The parish Church of Saint-Pierre has a Chalice which is registered as an historical object.

See also
Communes of the Loire-Atlantique department

Notes and references

Notes

References

External links
Abbaretz commune website 
Abbaretz on Géoportail, National Geographic Institute (IGN)  website 
Abbaretz on the 1750 Cassini Map

Communes of Loire-Atlantique